Divčibare is a town and mountain resort situated on the mountain Maljen (1104 m) in western Serbia, south-east of Valjevo, at the altitude of 980 metres above sea level. The permanent population of the town is 141 people (2011 census), although it varies significantly due to the flux of tourists and weekend house owners.

Divčibare is a highland, surrounded by several peaks and saddles, covered with snow for three to four months each year. In other seasons, the micro-climate is rather pleasant, with 280 annual sunny days. The climate is attributed to fresh and dry winds coming from the Mediterranean.

Facilities 

 Divčibare apartments
 Pepa Hotel, 200 beds
 Divčibare Hotel, 250 beds
 Maljen Hotel, 60 beds
 Five children's holiday camps, 800 beds
 Nineteen worker's resting facilities, 410 beds
 Motorist camp, Category II, 60 camping units
 Two mountain lodges, 50 beds
 Rentable rooms in private houses, 200 beds

There are two expert ski tracks (850 and 650 m), and several novice tracks.

Divčibare is accessible via well-maintained roads from the north (Valjevo), west (Mionica), and south (Požega). It has hosted several Serbia Rally (and formerly YU rally) competitions.

Sights 
Excursions to Valjevo and attractions in its vicinity include the Petnica Sports and Recreational Centre with four swimming pools and thermal mineral water, Petnica Cave, the Church of the Holy Mother's Assumption, the village of Brankovina, and Pustinja Monastery. Vrujci Spa is a town in the northwestern part of Serbia, at the northern base of the Suvobor mountain and in the valley of the River Toplica.

The second biggest waterfall in Serbia, Skakalo (20m) on Manastirica river is located nearby.

Gallery

See also
 List of spa towns in Serbia

References

External links 

 
 Divčibare travel guide

Populated places in Kolubara District
Spa towns in Serbia
Articles containing video clips